The protagonists and antagonists of Power Rangers Lightspeed Rescue are all residents of planet Earth with no alien characters appearing as a part of the cast. This series features the battle between the Lightspeed Rescue squad and the demons led by Queen Bansheera.

Lightspeed Rescue Power Rangers

The Lightspeed Rescue Rangers were recruited by the U.S. Government under Operation Lightspeed in order to fight ancient Demons that were attacking the fictional town of Mariner Bay, California. They were the first team of Power Rangers to be granted powers entirely through Earth human science and technology, and not through mystic forces, wild beasts, or by alien technology. They were also the first Power Rangers whose identities were known to the public because they are public servants recruited by officers and thus have no need to hide their identities - in this case, they are Power Rangers of a local public kind. The concept of Ranger powers being created by humans would be revisited in Time Force, Operation Overdrive, RPM and Beast Morphers.

Carter Grayson
Carter Grayson is a firefighter chosen to be the Red Lightspeed Ranger. He is the serious and devoted leader of the team. He risked his life with his daredevil maneuvers, but always saved those in danger.

When he was a child, he was rescued from a burning building by William Mitchell. It was because of this childhood rescue Carter went through in his past that he decided he wanted to be a firefighter as well. Mitchell kept an eye on Carter's career, which lead him to be chosen as the Red Lightspeed Ranger. Following a firefighter duty where he got a brief glimpse of Ghouligan, Carter was approached by Dana and two of Captain Mitchell's men and brought to the Lightspeed Aquabase by them.

He was the first to accept his role as a Lightspeed Power Ranger. He was also chosen to utilize the powers of the Titanium Morpher but was unable to as it proved too powerful for a normal human, despite his large muscles. He bravely took down Queen Bansheera in the final battle with the Demons, hurling her into the Shadow World for good. Carter returned to his firefighting occupation after his time at Lightspeed Rescue.

During the series, he develops serious romantic feelings for William Mitchell's daughter, Dana, the Pink Ranger, and it appeared to be mutual. It is unknown if they became a couple afterwards, even though they were the only Lightspeed Rangers seen together prior to the final battle of Super Megaforce.

When Vypra returned from the dead and began terrorizing Silver Hills, Carter reunited the Lightspeed Rescue Rangers, who helped the Time Force Rangers defeat her. When the Machine Empire's forces unearthed Zedd's Serpentera to destroy Earth, Carter teamed up with nine other Red Rangers and travelled to the moon to stop them in the Wild Force episode "Forever Red". He and Dana later appeared to help victims of the Warstar Armada's attack in Super Megaforce and again with their teammates in the final battle.

Carter survives capture during the events of "Shattered Grid" while his other teammates are captured by Drakon. He reveals his identity as a fire fighter to his fellow Rangers when Jen and Kimberly arrive with Karone in tow and offers aid. He later joins his fellow Rangers in a fight against Drakon's forces, however his powers are blasted away by Drakon's cannons before he and his allies are taken away from Corinth.

Carter is played by Sean CW Johnson.

Chad Lee
Chad Lee is a martial artist and aquatics performer chosen to be the Blue Lightspeed Ranger. He often spends time scuba diving, feeling connected to the marine life. He was working at a marine park when Captain Mitchell's men picked him up.

Chad brings to the team his exceptional martial arts ability, and water rescue skills. Chad studied under a karate master named Tomashiro, who felt that Chad's true destiny was as a martial arts master and not a Ranger. Tomashiro then helped train a monster named Cyclopter, hoping to replace Chad as his best student (Cyclopter even defeated Chad in battle) until Cyclopter turned on him. Chad remembers everything Tomashiro taught him then and defeats Cyclopter, and Tomashiro even comes to ask Chad for a tour of the Aquabase. Chad also temporarily had a relationship with the mermaid Marina, but they parted ways eventually. Chad becomes close with Yellow Ranger Kelsey during the series.

After leaving Lightspeed, Chad became a lifeguard but returned to help his team fight an undead Vypra with the Time Force Rangers, and again in Super Megaforce alongside other veteran Rangers in battling the last forces of the Armada.

Chad is played by Michael Chaturantabut.

Joel Rawlings
Joel Rawlings is an aerial stuntman under the name "The Sky Cowboy" and is recruited by Captain Mitchell to be the Green Lightspeed Ranger.

Following one of his aerial acts at an air show, Joel was approached by Captain Mitchell's men and brought to the Lightspeed Aquabase. He is extremely reluctant to become a Power Ranger at first, not believing in Lightspeed or what it has to offer. But when he sees his beloved Mariner Bay in danger, he decides to take them up on their offer.

He shows interest in the Rangers' assistant, Ms. Angela Fairweather. In the epilogue of the finale episode, Rawlings and Ms. Fairweather are about to go out on their first date when he is called away on Ranger business, unable to let his duties end with the Demons. He eventually marries her, and the two are seen heading off on their honeymoon right before he returns to the team to help battle Vypra with the Time Force Power Rangers. He would later join his teammates in the final battle with the Armada forces in Super Megaforce.

Joel is played by Keith Robinson.

Kelsey Winslow
Kelsey is extremely active physically, being a professional mountain climber and overall extreme sports enthusiast. She takes the job as the Lightspeed Rescue Yellow Ranger, seeing it as the most exciting thing of which she's ever heard. Kelsey recently reconciled with her grandmother, whose preoccupation with wealth and indifference towards Kelsey drove the two apart.

Kelsey is very much a free spirit, who loves extreme sports. She's very agile, and good at making quick decisions. However, she's also rather impulsive, hotheaded and often will attack without thinking out the consequences. This is shown when, after failing to correctly do a mission, she was nearly killed and had to be hospitalized.

Out of all the Rangers, Kelsey has the closest relationship with Chad, the Blue Lightspeed Ranger. They are often seen doing activities together, like martial arts.

Kelsey returned to extreme sports following the collapse of Lightspeed (starting with an extreme sports comp) after defeating Queen Bansheera and her forces to save Mariner Bay.

The Lightspeed Rangers were featured in a chronicle of Power Ranger history compiled by Tommy Oliver shortly after he formed the Dino Thunder Rangers, which was found by the nascent Ranger team in the Dino Lab.

Kelsey and the other Lightspeed Rangers returned as part of the army of Legendary Rangers that helped the Mega Rangers defeat the Armada once and for all, fighting in a huge battle against hundreds of X Borgs and dozens of Bruisers.

Kelsey is played by Sasha Williams.

Dana Mitchell
Dana Leigh Mitchell is the daughter of Captain Mitchell, younger sister of Ryan Mitchell, and trained in medical duties to serve as the Pink Lightspeed Ranger.

Dana is a tormented, reserved, stoic and compassionate young heroine who is also intellectual and level-headed. With help from two unnamed operatives, Dana gathers the team from all over Mariner Bay. Dana is a very invaluable asset to the team as one of the Rangers. She is very blunt with her words and easily gets impatient. Dana had a very brief stint as a model, but quits when she realized that being a Ranger was more important. She is later reconciled with her long-lost older brother, Ryan. During the series, she develops serious romantic feelings for Carter, the Red Ranger, and it appeared to be mutual. It is unknown if they became a couple afterwards. She often describes herself as an ugly duckling because she grew up without a mother, and later transforms into a beautiful swan. Towards the end of the series, Dana loses her fear and is stripped of her heavy burdens of her past. After Lightspeed Rescue, Dana fulfilled her dream of becoming a doctor and practices as a pediatrician. She was called into duty once more when Vypra returned and teamed with the Time Force Rangers. She and Carter appeared unmorphed to help civilians in Super Megaforce, and then again in uniform as part of the veteran Ranger army.

Dana is played  by Alison MacInnis.

Ryan Mitchell
Ryan Mitchell is Captain Mitchell's son, Dana Mitchell's older brother, and the Titanium Ranger.

When Ryan was very young, he was involved in an accident along with his father, Captain Mitchell, and his sister Dana, and all three were suspended over a cliff. Captain Mitchell had a secure grasp of Dana, but Ryan was hanging on by Mitchell's shoe. The spirit of Diabolico appeared and offered a deal to Captain Mitchell: Diabolico would save Ryan, but in payment he would raise Ryan himself and Captain Mitchell would not see him again until his 20th birthday. Captain Mitchell at first refused, not wanting to let his son be lost to someone else, but relented when Ryan began to fall. Mitchell later said that it was the hardest decision he had ever made.

Ryan was raised by Diabolico and taught that his father had rejected him, favoring Dana. Diabolico instructed him to steal the prototype Titanium Morpher from the Lightspeed Base and destroy the Rangers (including his sister Dana) with the Titanium Ranger power. He nearly succeeded, but Ms. Fairweather brought out the V-Lancers, which overpowered Ryan. Just as the Rangers were about to destroy Ryan, however, Captain Mitchell (recognizing Ryan's visible eyes) called them back and told them the back story. After some soul-searching, Ryan turns on Diabolico and joins the Lightspeed Rescue Rangers, thus reuniting with his family. Because of Ryan's treachery, Diabolico did a dream attack where he placed a curse on him in the form of a cobra tattoo which would get closer to his neck every time he morphed until it destroyed him. Ryan eventually found and destroyed the Cobra Monster that was the source of the curse, breaking it.

After a while, Ryan left to find more information about the demons and find a way to defeat them. This was because of the lack of a storyline in the Sentai footage. He would eventually return to join the Rangers in the final battle and return his morpher to Lightspeed Rescue.

In "Time for Lightspeed", the team-up special episode of Time Force, Ryan shows up again to help the Lightspeed and Time Force Rangers battle Vypra when she summons the super demon Quarganon, appearing alongside Quantum Ranger Eric Myers. He would also join the veteran Ranger army in Super Megaforce.

He is the first Ranger with no Japanese Sentai counterpart of origin (as there was no Sixth Ranger in GoGoV), followed by the A-Squad Rangers in S.P.D. and the Spirit Rangers in Jungle Fury. He is also the only American-exclusive Sixth Ranger in the franchise. The Titanium Ranger's design is also noticeably different from the original GoGoV uniforms. The uniform is based on the suit designs of Turboranger, with minor tweaks such as a Lightspeed belt, gloves, boots and gold shoulder pads. The helmet is modeled after the Lightspeed helmet (single color and no mouthpiece) and its visor is modeled after the V from the original Sentai title. This helmet was later recreated for Super Megaforce, but with the error of a piece previously hidden by the visor being visible outside it. He was also the only Ranger-exclusive hero featured in the battle.

Ryan is played by Rhett Fisher.

Zords

Lightspeed Rescuezords
The Lightspeed Rescuezords are transports by Rail Rescues and launch from the Mariner Bay.
 Pyro Rescue 1: Carter Grayson's ladder truck, equipped with two extending Ladder Arms for rescuing people trapped in high places. The ladders are tipped with robotic hands which enable them to smash through any obstructions to reach trapped civilians, manipulate its environment, and even to hoist Pyro Rescue 1 onto Hydro Mode to form Lightspeed Megazord. For extra stability, Pyro Rescue 1 can deploy support braces from its front and rear bumpers when using its ladders. Forms the Lightspeed Megazord's body and arms.
 Aqua Rescue 2: Chad Lee's chemical fire engine, equipped with four Chemical Discharger extinguisher cannons. Forms Hydro Mode's cockpit and Lightspeed Megazord's hips.
 Aero Rescue 3: Joel Rawlings' aircraft whose rotating jet engines give it great maneuverability and VTOL (Vertical Take-Off and Landing) capabilities. It is equipped with the dual Impact Guns and a ventral hatch which it uses to drop extinguisher bombs on fires as well as deploy magnetic Grapple Wires to air lift vehicles out of danger or aid the other Lightspeed Rescuezords in combining into Hydro Mode and Lightspeed Megazord. Forms Lightspeed Megazord's head and back.
 Haz Rescue 4: Kelsey Winslow's giant armored vehicle. It possesses the Shovel Arm claw in its trunk which can be used to move debris and other obstructions. Forms the left leg of both Hydro Mode and Lightspeed Megazord.
 Med Rescue 5: Dana Mitchell's giant ambulance whose rear bay allows it to carry mass numbers of civilians to safely evacuate them from a battle or disaster scene. Forms the right leg of both Hydro Mode and Lightspeed Megazord.

Rail Rescues
The Rail Rescues are five super powered train cars which combine into the Supertrain. The Rail Rescues are deployed from the Aquabase's train bay, which rises from the ocean and connects with Mariner Bay's own rail system.
 Rail Rescue 1: A locomotive which transports the Pyro Rescue 1 or the Omegazord 1, forms the Supertrain Megazord's right arm.
 Rail Rescue 2: A subway car which transports the Aqua Rescue 2 or the Omegazord 2, forms the Supertrain Megazord's left arm.
 Rail Rescue 3: A freighter which transports the Aero Rescue 3 or the Omegazord 3, forms the Supertrain Megazord's head, torso, and upper legs.
 Rail Rescue 4: A coach car which transports the Haz Rescue 4 or the Omegazord 4, forms the Supertrain Megazord's lower left leg.
 Rail Rescue 5: A bullet train which transports the Med Rescue 5 or the Omegazord 5, forms the Supertrain Megazord's lower right leg.

Omegazords
The Omega Zords are five spacecraft created by Ms. Fairweather and her team.
 Omegazord 1: Piloted by Carter Grayson. It is armed with missiles
 Omegazord 2: Piloted by Chad Lee. It shoots hole-repairing adhesive bullets.
 Omegazord 3: Piloted by Joel Rawlings. It is the most maneuverable of the Omegazords.
 Omegazord 4: Piloted by Kelsey Winslow'. It is heavily armored and equipped with manipulator claw.
 Omegazord 5: Piloted by Dana Mitchell. It is equipped with manipulator claw and medical tools.

Megazords
 Lightspeed Megazord: The Lightspeed Rescue Rangers' first giant robot, formed from the five Lightspeed Rescuezords. It is armed with the Lightspeed Megazord Saber. Lightspeed Megazord's finisher Fire Circle. First the Hydro Mode is formed – the Aqua Rescue 2 forms the Hydro Mode's cockpit (the Lightspeed Megazord's waist) and upper legs, the Haz Rescue 4 forms the Lightspeed Megazord's lower left leg and the Med Rescue 5 forms the Lightspeed Megazord's lower right leg. The Hydro Mode is equipped with the Chemical Extinguishers. After forming the Hydro Mode they form the Lightspeed Megazord, in which the Pyro Rescue 1 forms the chest and arms and the Aero Rescue 3 forms the head and upper back. This robot is equipped with extendable arms used in an attack called Ladder arms, where the arms extend and deliver long-range punches. Another attack the Lightspeed Megazord can execute is the Spinning kick. It was destroyed as part of the Lightspeed Solarzord by Diabolico and Olympius.
 Supertrain Megazord: A group of five Rail Rescues that were designed to carry the Lightspeed Rescuezord into battle. After the Omegazords were built, the Rail Rescues was loaded with the Omegazords and hauled into space by the Max Solarzord in the Max Solarzord with Rail Rescues formation for the Lightspeed Rescue Rangers to use the Omega Megazord. The Rail Rescues was also modified to form their own giant robo, Supertrain Megazord. The robot has gatling weapons, as well as its Gatling Blasters and Turbine Supercharge finishers (where the cannon weapons are transferred from the shoulders to the fists to provide additional power. Towards the finale, the Supertrain Megazord was badly damaged by Diabolico.
 Max Solarzord: Modelled after a bullet train, it was piloted by Ryan Mitchell. The Max Solarzord can haul the Rail Rescues that is loaded with the Omegazords into space. Max Solarzord can transform into Warrior Mode and combine with the Lightspeed Megazord to form the Lightspeed Solarzord. The Max Solarzord's body was destroyed as part of the Lightspeed Solarzord towards the finale by the Super Demons Diabolico and Olympius.
 Lightspeed Solarzord: When the Lightspeed Megazord combines with the Max Solarzord it creates the Lightspeed Solarzord with the command "3-5-6" in the Battle Booster. Armaments provided from the Max Solarzord include jets stored within the feet that provide additional maneuverability, and the two small wrist guns. The Max Solarzord forms Lightspeed Solarzord's helmet, breastplate, pauldrons, gauntlets, fauld and greaves. Another equipment the Lightspeed Solarzord has is an array of solar panels, which enables it to absorb power from explosions. In its finisher, it unleashes its rail-gun style hip cannons and combines the firepower from them." In the finale, the Lightspeed Solarzord was blown to pieces by Diabolico and Olympius.
 Omega Megazord: The five Omegazords can combine to form the Omega Crawler with the command "4-5-6" in the Battle Booster – a four-legged mecha with the Omega Lance on its top, or in the more humanoid Omega Megazord. By launching the Omega Missile Blast from its Omega Staff. It once used Lightspeed Megazord Saber for an attack called Fire Circle. In the Trakeena's Revenge, the Omega Megazord briefly gained the power of the Galaxy Rangers' Lights of Orion and became Orion Omega Megazord, wielding both the Omega Lance and the Orion Galaxy Megazord Saber in its enhanced mode. In the finale, the Omega Megazord was damaged by Diabolico and Olympius but repaired by Lightspeed Rescue Crew. Later, it was hijacked by Jinxer and his Batlings to place a circle of stones around Mariner Bay; their goal was to assist Queen Bansheera in opening the gateway into the Shadow World only for the Megazord to be destroyed by the Mobile Armor Vehicle.
 Lifeforce Megazord: The final robot, which resembles the Lightspeed Solarzord but is colored black. This Megazord is powered by the Lightspeed Rescue Rangers' life energy and has a sword that resembles the Lightspeed Megazord Saber, but the insignia on its hilt has a red color rather than a blue color. It is used in the final battle by the Lightspeed Rescue Rangers to stop Diabolico and Olympius, after the original Lightspeed Solarzord was destroyed and both the Omega Megazord and Supertrain Megazord were rendered useless. But Jinxer planted the card on the leg of the Lifeforce Megazord, allowing a massive army of Batlings to invade the Aquabase and commandeer the Megazord, forcing the Lightspeed Rangers to fire torpedoes from their submarine to destroy it.

Allies of the Power Rangers

Captain William Mitchell
Captain William Mitchell is the captain of the Lightspeed Aquabase, mentor to the Lightspeed Rangers and father of Dana and Ryan.

In his earlier life, he once worked as a firefighter who saved a young Carter but received a huge scar on his right shoulder.

Later on, he was involved in a car accident that left him, Dana and Ryan hanging from a cliff. He had a secure grasp of a bleeding Dana but a frightened Ryan was hanging on by Mitchell's leg. The spirit of Diabolico appeared and offered a deal to the captain...he would save Ryan, but in payment, he would raise Ryan himself and Captain Mitchell would not see his son him again until his 20th birthday. Mitchell at first refused, but relented when Ryan began to fall. He later said that it was the hardest decision he had ever made. He is often tormented by nightmares of Dana and Ryan getting killed, which leads to over-protectiveness of them both, but later learns that his children had just been knocked out.

Upon the release of the Demons, he was responsible for gathering the ones who became the Lightspeed Rangers (chosen for their special abilities) by sending Dana and two unnamed operatives to pick them up with Dana later hearing from him that she would be the Rangers' fifth member (because Mitchell trained her during her childhood in medical work). When Ryan had recently reappeared, Mitchell successfully convinced him to leave Diabolico's side and join him as the Titanium Ranger. He cares for Ryan and Dana with fierce devotion, rescuing them in very dangerous moments such as when Dana was captured and he went after her himself; another time was when Ryan was trapped in the Cobra's lair and the captain freed him.

Captain Mitchell is played by Ron Roggé.

Angela Fairweather
Ms. Angela Fairweather is the Lightspeed Aquabase's residential scientist and Ranger Expert. Before Kat Manx from S.P.D., Ms. Fairweather developed Zords, weaponry, and vehicles for the Rangers. She is the sister of Clark Fairweather who is also a Ranger expert. Ms. Fairweather is often seen and recognized for wearing black sheer pantyhose.

Throughout the series, Joel Rawlings often flirts with her, though she initially wasn't interested in him (once even lying to him saying there was a protocol and at Lightspeed saying that Lightspeed members couldn't interact with each other). In the final episode, she finally consents to go on a date with him.

Half a season later, in the "Time for Lightspeed" team-up, the two are seen heading off to their honeymoon. When Joel is contacted by Carter, Ms. Fairweather convinces him to help Carter.

Ms. Fairweather is played by Monica Louwerens.

Marina
Marina is a lovely mermaid who was romantically interested in Chad Lee and is the daughter of Neptune. She was used by Vypra in a botched plan against Chad.

Taking on human legs, Marina later asked for Chad's help in recovering her father's trident from Aquafiend.

Marina is played by Kamera Walton.

Demons
50 centuries ago, a faction of evil demons had plans to destroy and conquer the Earth. They were sealed away in the Tomb of Forever by a powerful warlock. In the present day, a group of wandering nomads accidentally freed them. The demons are angry to find that humans have built the city of Mariner Bay over their former palace and vow to get it back. They also worked to revive Queen Bansheera. The leader of the demons at any one time (below Bansheera herself) wielded the Star Power which was passed from its initial owner, Diabolico, to Bansheera's son, Olympius, during the course of the series as Bansheera awaits the day to release the demons from the Shadow World.

Queen Bansheera
Queen Bansheera (whose name is based on the Banshee of Irish Mythology) is the evil monarch of the demons. She was in parts unknown when Diabolico and his band were freed, but eventually joins her subjects in the Skull Cavern by adopting a form made of pure energy. Her son Prince Olympius enacts a ceremony to restore her physical form with the help of Spellbinder. Due to the Rangers' interference, the ceremony is only able to bring Bansheera back in a rudimentary, cocoon-like form. Later on, she absorbs Vypra's life energy to complete her resurrection and regain her true body.

Once restored, Bansheera sets out for world domination, proving far more ruthless than Diabolico or Olympius. She forces Diabolico to destroy Loki, leaves her own son in the Shadow World, and nearly destroys the Rangers. A vengeful Diabolico reveals her weak spot - her heart - to Carter, but she continues to menace the Rangers. She eventually turned Diabolico and Olympius into Super Demons, but they are defeated (after destroying several Megazords).

For her final plan, Bansheera intends to open a portal to the Shadow World (disguised as a sarcophagus) to free all the demons from the Shadow World. Taking over the Aquabase and the Omega Megazord, she was close to succeeding. However, Carter kicks her into the portal, forcing Bansheera to grab him in an attempt to drag him with her. During the final struggle, Diabolico's spirit intervenes as Queen Bansheera tells Diabolico that he was just in time to help. Diabolico reveals that he is actually here to help the Rangers defeat her as severing his former queen's tentacles with an energy blast. Howling in defeat, Bansheera falls into the Shadow World where she is mauled by the hordes of demons and monsters within.

Queen Bansheera is voiced by Diane Salinger.

Prince Olympius
Prince Olympius was the dragon-like son of Queen Bansheera and the prince of the demons. His father is never mentioned. At the beginning of the series, he is still an infant demon, named Impus, who was cared for by the Demons in his mother's absence. As Bansheera repeatedly threatened to give Impus Diabolico's Star Power, the baby demon served as the primary threat and motivation for Diabolico's quest to destroy Mariner Bay and the Lightspeed Rangers. Eventually, Impus gained the Star Power when Diabolico was destroyed for the first time, causing him to encase himself in a red and black cocoon. Soon after, he completed his evolution and emerged from the cocoon as Olympius. He took Diabolico's place as the Rangers' main antagonist, but his youth and inexperience left him less adept than his predecessor.

Shortly after his metamorphosis, he gained access to the Aquabase by capturing four of the Rangers, enabling him to assume their forms. Carter Grayson (the Red Lightspeed Ranger) was able to see right through him and foiled his plans, resulting in Olympius falling into the sea. Exposure to water caused Olympius to lose most of his personal power, including his ability to shape-shift. No longer a physical match for the Rangers or his fellow demons, Olympius found himself forced into a subservient position as Vypra and Loki took command of the demon forces.

Despite his decreased power, Olympius still managed to cause trouble for the Rangers. In one battle, he actually destroyed the Rangers by using a device that allowed him to use the Rescue Bird against them. Unfortunately for him, Carter's experimental Mobile Armor Vehicle malfunctioned, sending the Red Ranger back in time. Realizing what had happened, Carter was able to change history and prevent Olympius from pulling the trigger on the other Lightspeed Rangers. Olympius has a strong hatred for Carter and repeatedly attempts to capture him, but his attempts are always unsuccessfully carried out.

Eventually, Olympius managed to revive Queen Bansheera, but instead of treating him like a prince, she treated him as just another expendable pawn like the rest of her minions. His plans to win her affection were unsuccessful, causing him to quickly lose her favor. When he discovered that Vypra and Loki were to take his place as second-in-command, he plotted to eliminate them by using the monster, Vilevine, to bury the two of them alive. Vypra and Loki survived and resurrected Diabolico during Olympius' next attempt to destroy the Rangers by having the Shadow World's Gatekeeper trap the Rangers in the Shadow World, roaming with defeated demons. However, he himself became trapped at Diabolico's bidding when the gateway was destroyed and the key was stolen - to add insult to injury, the Rangers eventually escaped.

To escape the Shadow World, Olympius began defeating the other occupants of the realm, absorbing their energy and evolving into a more powerful, monstrous form. Meanwhile, Jinxer - still loyal to the demon prince - hypnotized Captain Mitchell, commanding him to place a Star Power link inside the Aquabase generator to provide Olympius with more energy. After breaking free of the Shadow World, Olympius seem unstoppable until Ms. Fairweather broke the link to the Aquabase's energy, weakening Olympius enough for the Rangers to defeat him and destroy his Star Power. He was left under the care of Jinxer for a short time, regaining his strength.

Upon recovering his power and after Vypra and Loki's deaths at Bansheera's hand, Olympius took revenge on Diabolico by besting him in battle and having his mother turn Diabolico into a mindless slave. With his new minion in tow, Olympius attacked the Rangers, but his plans were derailed when Diabolico regained his mind and rebelled against Olympius. Although the demon prince was able to destroy Diabolico once again, the Rangers used the opportunity to destroy him in return. Queen Bansheera revived both Diabolico and Olympius in new "Super Demon" forms, allowing them to demolish almost all of the Megazords. Victory seemed at hand until the Rangers brought in their latest and most powerful Megazord: the Life Force Megazord, which killed the two demons once and for all.

Impus was responsible for the creation of a variety of different monsters, most of them either fire-elemental (like Fireor and Trifire) or reptilian (Freezard and Infinitor). Other creatures affiliated with him included Mantevil, Vilevine, and an unhatched Monster Egg (which was predicted to grow into a giant hydra monster). After maturing into Olympius, he proved to be a noteworthy adversary to the Rangers. However, using the Star Power put a great strain on him; he had to gradually get used to his new powers. In his first encounter with the Rangers he swiftly defeated them and managed to capture four of them within the Star Power. Soon after, he used the Star Power to turn himself into nearly identical duplicates of his prisoners and used this power to infiltrate the Aquabase. However, after being weakened from exposure to water, he could no longer contain the Rangers inside the Star Power.

In battle, Olympius displayed excellent physical strength, stamina, and skills with various weaponry. He primarily used a double-bladed spear, but occasionally used some of the Rangers' own weapons against them, including Carter's Rescue Blaster and the Rescue Bird. Olympius also has shown the ability of pyrokinesis by expelling fire and controlling it. He is a skilled warrior, defeating an army of undead demons during his time in the Shadow World and even besting Diabolico twice (destroying him outright the second time). In his more powerful draconic form, he displayed great powers by reflecting the Rangers' weaponry and firing his own energy. However, to maintain his strength in this form he needed an external energy source (for this he drained power from the Aquabase); without a suitable energy source he was considerably hindered. Even so, he managed to survive blows from the Omega Megazord and Lightspeed Solarzord that would have normally destroyed other monsters, weakening enough only to revert him back to his normal form and destroy his Star Power. In his Super Demon form, he was at the peak of his power; by combining his powers with Diabolico, he managed to destroy nearly all of the Rangers' Megazords, a feat that very few villains and monsters have achieved in the series.

Olympius alters his appearance and anatomy over the series, though all his forms have a red color scheme and draconic aspects. His infant form was a mix of a Furby with a baby dragon. His second (adult) form is a humanoid dragon-like warrior with a white face. After escaping from the Shadow World, Olympius developed more demonic features, including large horns, talons, and tail, a snake-like neck, bestial musculature, and a Malebolgia-like jaw. His Super Demon form exaggerates his monstrous features in a Godzilla-like fashion, with a longer, more reptilian snout and the removal of white colors on his face.

Impus is voiced by Brianne Siddall while his adult form of Olympius is voiced by Michael Forest.

Diabolico
Diabolico (a name based on the word "diabolical," whose root comes from the Spanish for "devil") is the primary villain for the first part of the Lightspeed Rescue series. He is a golden devil-like demon with an elongated skull, multiple horns and spikes on his head and shoulders, and a second monstrous face on his chest. With Queen Bansheera absent and Prince Impus still an infant, Diabolico is the de facto leader of the demons. In addition to commanding the villains, Diabolico was given the Star Power by Queen Bansheera prior to his imprisonment, indicating that she considered him to be her greatest servant.

Some time before the series, Diabolico appeared before Captain Mitchell and his two children when they were hanging off the edge of a cliff after a car accident. He offered to save Mitchell's son, Ryan, if he could take custody of the boy; unable to let his son fall to his doom, Mitchell reluctantly agreed. After telling Mitchell that Ryan would return on his twentieth birthday, Diabolico saved the boy from his fall and spirited him away for training as a mighty warrior.

Diabolico led the demons' efforts to destroy Mariner Bay and rebuild Queen Bansheera's empire, but the Lightspeed Rangers thwarted him at every turn. After several failures, he sent Ryan - now a bitter young man - to steal the Titanium Morpher from the Aquabase and use its power against the Rangers. Unfortunately for Diabolico, Captain Mitchell was able to redeem his son, who returned the Titanium Morpher and informed Diabolico that he was severing his ties with him.

Queen Bansheera quickly became tired of Diabolico's failures, threatening to take his Star Power and give it to her son Impus if her general could not produce results soon. In response, Diabolico summoned his most powerful monsters - Demonite, Falkar, and Thunderon - with orders to spread explosive feathers across Mariner Bay and destroy the Rangers when they tried to interfere. The powerful demons almost succeeded in their task, but Ryan - having accepted his role as a hero - became the Titanium Ranger once again and fended off the monsters. As punishment for Ryan's interference, Diabolico cursed his one-time protege; every time he morphed, a cobra tattoo would move up his back until it reached his neck and killed him.

Despite this advantage, Diabolico's monsters continued to fail against the Lightspeed Rangers. Growing increasingly desperate, Diabolico considered killing Impus himself to prevent himself from losing his Star Power, but lost the chance when the other demons walked in on him. In a final attempt to destroy the Power Rangers, he personally enlarged himself and engaged them in battle. He had the upper hand until Ryan - now purged of the cobra curse - joined the team, allowing them to form the Lightspeed Solarzord. This new Megazord absorbed one of Diabolico's blasts and used it to power its cannons, bombarding Diabolico until he finally fell in defeat. With his destruction, the Star Power went to Impus, who quickly matured into Olympius.

As with all defeated monsters, Diabolico's spirit was sent to the Shadow World. However, he was eventually revived by Vypra and Loki to take revenge on Olympius, who used Vilevine to try and destroy them. Diabolico immediately returned to his queen's side, attempting to regain favor with her and recapture the Star Power from Olympius. He managed to trap the demon prince in the Shadow World, but Olympius escaped, vowing vengeance on Diabolico in turn. Diabolico also thwarted the Sorcerer of the Sands' attempt to destroy Skull Cavern, annihilating the ancient wizard in the process.

When Queen Bansheera regained her body after absorbing Vypra and sent Loki to eliminate the Rangers, Diabolico overheard her declaring that she was only using Loki to try and destroy all of her foes at once. He immediately came to Loki's aid, only to be sucked into a vortex and dropped outside Skull Cavern with his fellow demon and four of the Lightspeed Rangers. During the resulting battle, Bansheera forced Diabolico to fire on the Rangers before Loki could get out of the way; the Rangers survived, but Loki did not. Infuriated at his queen's callousness, Diabolico contacted Carter (currently trying to free his friends from Skull Cavern) and revealed Bansheera's weak spot. Although Carter took Diabolico's advice and was able to free the victims of the vortex, Bansheera survived, forcing Diabolico to flee.

While walking through a forest and fuming over the deaths of Vypra and Loki, Diabolico encountered Olympius, who had been hiding out while recovering from his last battle with the Rangers. The two demons battled fiercely, but Diabolico was defeated in the end. He was dragged back to Queen Bansheera, who turned him into Olympius' mindless "pet". The two then attacked the Rangers, but some verbal pushing from Carter reawakened Diabolico's mind. As he battled Olympius, he tried to give Carter the key to the Ancient Tomb, but Olympius killed him moments before he could do so. After the Rangers killed Olympius in turn, Bansheera revived the two of them as giant Super Demons. More powerful than ever and firmly under Bansheera's control, Diabolico wreaked havoc on the city and the Rangers' Megazords alongside Olympius. It took the power of the new Lifeforce Megazord to finally destroy the two Super Demons, after which Diabolico's key flew to the Ancient Tomb and revealed the final plan of Queen Bansheera.

Although Diabolico was destroyed, he made one final appearance at the very end of The Fate of Lightspeed. While Queen Bansheera attempted to drag Carter into a portal to the Shadow World, Diabolico's spirit appeared before them and offered his help. To Bansheera's dismay, Diabolico intervened on the Rangers' behalf, severing her tentacles with a blast of energy. As the Rangers pulled Carter out and closed the tomb, Diabolico's laughing spirit forced Queen Bansheera into the Shadow World, leaving her at the mercy of the imprisoned demons.

Diabolico displayed strong spiritual powers, as he was able to appear in a spiritual form even when he was imprisoned and after being destroyed. He displayed some knowledge of magic, as he recognized and countered the spell used by the Sorcerer of the Sands to try and destroy Skull Cavern. One of his odder abilities allowed him to detach his hand and send it to grab distant objects before pulling them back to himself (or sending himself to his hand's location). He could also control the weather and fire energy blasts from his hands and mouths. His weapon of choice was a skull-themed staff with axe-like blades at one end, capable of firing powerful blasts of varying form. With the Star Power, Diabolico was immensely powerful; one of his energy beams was enough to put a hole through the Supertrain Megazord. Even without the Star Power, he was a competent fighter, nearly besting Olympius in their first battle.

After being brainwashed by Queen Bansheera, Diabolico's eyes become pure black, with small arcs of electricity running across them periodically. In his Super Demon form, Diabolico takes on a more monstrous appearance, sprouting more spikes on his body and lengthening his existing horns. Instead of his staff, he wielded a jewel-encrusted sword as his weapon. His power was at its absolute peak in this form; alongside Olympius, he destroyed nearly all of the Rangers' Megazords, a feat that only the strongest monsters and villains in the Power Rangers franchise can achieve.

Some subliminal messages suggest that Diabolico is Olympius' father: he was clearly a favorite of Bansheera (presumably an ex-lover), the other demons saw him as a kind of a king consort under their queen, and Olympius was expected to succeed him as the owner of the Star Power.

Diabolico also appears as the sixth and final boss in Power Rangers Lightspeed Rescue for Game Boy Color.

Diabolico is voiced by Neil Kaplan.

Vypra
Vypra is one of only two female demons, along with Queen Bansheera. She is the most human-looking demon, resembling a young, dark-haired woman wearing serpentine armor and bat-like wings. She is skilled in dark magic. Initially, Vypra was considered a motherly figure to the young Impus, but she began to look down on him as an immature leader after he matured into Olympius.

Vypra personally led several attacks on the Rangers over the course of the series. In combat, she primarily used a thin saber that could unleash energy disks. She also piloted the Vyprari, a swift vehicle resembling a modified dune buggy. She almost never took hits, particularly because her armor does not fully cover her torso, but apparently she was vulnerable to damage, because in at least one episode, Carter was able to hold her up by threatening to shoot her.

After Olympius lost favor with his mother, he discovered that she was considering making Loki and Vypra second in command. He plotted to eliminate them by having Vilevine bury them alive. Loki and Vypra retaliated by bringing back Diabolico from the dead to deal with him. Having failed in her last attempt to destroy the Rangers, Vypra was absorbed by Queen Bansheera to use her energy to regain a bodily form.

In the "Time for Lightspeed" episode of Power Rangers Time Force after Bansheera's defeat, Vypra is seen to have escaped from Bansheera's body and emerging from a graveyard and returns from the dead with an army of undead soldiers. She teams up with the mutant Ransik to obtain an artifact called the Solar Amulet. With its Dark Magic from the Shadow World and the sun being in perfect alignment with the stars, she used its power to revive the Super Demon Quarganon in Silver Hills. However, she was killed again by Wesley Collins (Red Time Force Ranger) with his Red Battle Warrior and Quarganon by Carter with his Trans-Armor Cycle. Her resurrection is never explained.

Vypra is played by Jennifer L. Yen (episodes 1; 4-37) and Wen Yann Shih (episodes 2 and 3).

Loki
Loki (pronounced "Low-kai") is a fierce and loyal Kobold-like demon warrior and friend to Diabolico (to whom Loki gave a spider/scorpion-shaped amulet to as a token of their millennia-long friendship) and Vypra. He serves as the dumb muscle of the demons, and was considered expendable by Queen Bansheera despite his loyalty.

The monsters Loki created were mainly earth-elemental, including Quakemon and Elestomp. In battle, Loki normally used a two-pronged staff as his weapon, but in "The Wrath of the Queen", the final episode he appeared in, he used a bazooka that was in the shape of a dragon's head. Loki could also expel electricity from his eyes.

When Diabolico was destroyed for the first time, Loki and Vypra were anguished by his death and considered the newly matured Olympius as a mere child who would not make a suitable leader, Loki refuses to take abuse from Olympius. After losing favor with his mother, Olympius discovered that Bansheera considered making Vypra and Loki the new second in command and plotted to eliminate them by having Vilevine bury them alive. The two managed to survive and escape to where the demons were first imprisoned and brought Diabolico back to life to help get rid of Olympius.

After regaining her body (at the expense of Vypra's life), Queen Bansheera allowed Loki to personally go after the Rangers, calling him her "favorite" servant. In truth, however, Loki was being used in a plan to destroy the Power Rangers when Diabolico tries to warn him; during the resulting battle, Bansheera telekinetically took control of Diabolico's body and forced him to use Loki's bazooka to take aim at the Rangers, an act that would also risk harming Loki. The Rangers managed to survive the blast, but he was fatally wounded. Loki laments that he should have listened to Diabolico and died in his arms, his body exploding and reduced to ash in the typical way monsters were destroyed. This proved to be the final straw for Diabolico, who began actively working against his queen to avenge the death of his friend.

Loki is voiced by David Lodge.

Jinxer
Jinxer (whose name is based on the term "jinx") is a fly-like demon who served Queen Bansheera and her henchmen. He was highly insightful and skilled in the ways of magic. He specialized in using magic cards for various purposes such as summoning Batlings, creating monsters, and empowering or reviving fallen demons. He was also skilled in use of hypnotism and magical artifacts. He was a cowardly sort of villain, relying on his summoned monsters and Batlings, but he did battle the Rangers at least a few times. His method of attacking was using a cane-like blaster.

He is extremely loyal to Olympius, supporting him even after the villain was trapped in the Shadow World. In "Olympius Unbound", Jinxer devises a plan to free the demon prince; disguising himself as hypnotist Mr. Mesmer (played by Benton Jennings), he plants an evil suggestion in Captain Mitchell's subconscious. While Olympius defeats demon spirits in the Shadow World to gain enough power to return to the living world, Jinxer puppeteers Captain Mitchell into placing a Star Power gemstone in the Aquabase's generator, diverting its power to Olympius himself. The Rangers manage to foil Olympius' plot for power, but Jinxer remains loyal, retrieving the prince's body and hiding him in a cave to tend his wounds.

During the Rangers' battle against the Super Demon forms of Diabolico and Olympius, Jinxer realized that he was out of monsters and magic spell cards; a single Batling card was all that he had left. With no other ideas, he planted the card on the leg of the Lifeforce Megazord, allowing a massive army of Batlings to invade the Aquabase and commandeer the remaining Megazords. Jinxer himself and a small faction of Batlings piloted the newly repaired Omega Megazord to place a circle of stones around Mariner Bay; their goal was to assist Queen Bansheera in opening the gateway into the Shadow World. After placing the final stone, Carter and Ryan destroyed the Omega Megazord by ramming the Mobile Armor Vehicle into it; Jinxer's final fate is never on screen, but it is assumed he and some Batlings were destroyed as well.

Jinxer is voiced by Kim Strauss.

Troika Demons
The Troika Demons are a trio of fallen angel-like demons who serve as Diabolico's strongest servants. He saved their cards as a last resort against the Rangers, only unleashing them when it seemed that Queen Bansheera was planning to transfer his Star Power to Impus if he failed her again.

The Troika Demons' first attempt to destroy the Rangers involved spreading feathers from their wings across Mariner Bay - when the sun set, the feathers would explode and devastate the city. Fortunately, Lightspeed Rescue was able to retrieve almost all of the feathers (the last was thrown away by Ryan) before the sun set. With their foes drawn into the open, the three warriors engaged the five Rangers in battle, defeating them with ease. However, they were soundly defeated in turn by Ryan, who had accepted his destiny as the Titanium Ranger.

After returning to report their failure, the Troika Demons were sent back into the city to try again. This time, Diabolico provided them with two new advantages over the Rangers: Ryan had been cursed with a cobra tattoo that would eventually destroy him if he morphed too many times, and Demonite had been given a mirror card that allowed him to create a clone of himself - with these new tricks up their sleeves, the Troika Demons tried to draw the primary Rangers away from Ryan, leaving Demonite's clone to attack the weakened Titanium Ranger; however, the clone was destroyed along with his template.

Despite the loss of their leader, Falkar and Thunderon were quickly redeployed against the Rangers, still proving to be a match for them. It was only after the Rangers managed to separate the demons that they finally overcame them. After Falkar and Thunderon were supersized by Diabolico, Ryan risked his life to use the Max Solarzord against the two demons when the other Rangers were having a tough time fighting them.

Fitting their ranks as Diabolico's greatest minions, the Troika Demons lasted a fairly long time against the Rangers - the fight against them made up a four-episode arc in the series (from "Ryan's Destiny" to "The Cobra Strikes").

Demonite
Demonite is a demonic knight-like warrior and the leader of the trio. In battle, he equips a sword gauntlet over his right hand, which was sharp enough to slice a car in two. He could also fire lasers from his eyes. He was eventually lured into a trap by the Rangers, leaving him facing a pair of guns wielded by Carter. The Red Ranger is reluctant to shoot - largely because he would risk destroying himself - but Demonite's attempt to attack forces him to fire. Although Demonite is destroyed in the blast, Diabolico revives him as a giant, stronger, and more monstrous version where he wields two sword gauntlets and no longer wears a helmet. Demonite's advanced form is destroyed by the Lightspeed Megazord. His gem is red and bears an image of his sword.

Demonite is voiced by David Stenstrom.

Thunderon
Thunderon is a hulking, green-skinned Viking/ghoul-like demon with small angel wings on his back. He attacked with his brute strength, which proved great enough to actually juggle the Rangers in the air if he got a hold of them. His gauntlets were equipped with spiked knuckles to increase his punching power, and he could shoot green electricity from his eyes. He seemingly managed to defeat the Rangers, but they were faking defeat in order to blast him at a close range with their V-Lancers. Thunderon was destroyed by a second combined blast, but Diabolico revived him as a giant. Unlike his comrades, his appearance did not change in the process. Despite getting backup from a reluctant Falkar, Thunderon is destroyed the Max Solarzord. His gem is green and bears an image of one of his fists.

Thunderon is voiced by Alonzo Bodden.

Falkar
Falkar is an elf/falcon-themed warrior. He behaved in an effeminate manner and used a three-pronged staff, which he could use to stab opponents or as a base for a high-speed spinning kick. He could also fire blue energy beams from the eyes of his falcon-helmet. While battling the Rangers alongside Thunderon, Falkar is lured into an old building by the Pink and Yellow Rangers and buried under rubble. By the time Falkar dug himself out, the Rangers had engaged a giant Thunderon with their Megazord. Although Falkar attempts to stay on the sidelines, planning to have Thunderon do the work of defeating the Rangers and take credit for it, Diabolico finds him and advises that he joins the fight. Falkar states that he'd like to see how Thunderon does first. Diabolico insists anyway and uses an Advanced Growth Card on Falkar which merged his helmet with his head, giving him a draconic-like form where he gains super-strength and can perform a more powerful spinning kick with the help of his staff. Falkar is destroyed by the Max Solarzord. His gem is brown and bears an image of one of the wings on his shin plates.

Falkar is voiced by Ezra Weisz.

Troika
After each Troika demon was destroyed, their bodies transformed into a colored gem that returned to Diabolico's possession - using these gems, Diabolico revives and combines the Demons into Troika, a powerful chimeric warrior with white feathers/fur covering most of his body. The faces of his component demons are all present on different sides of his head with Demonite's face in the center, Thunderon's face on the left side of his head, and Falkar's face on the right side of his head. His body includes Demonite's right arm and sword, Thunderon's left arm, and Falkar's feet, the chest is black and bears all three of the Troika Demons' gems over a white visage resembling screaming ghosts. Troika combines the best abilities of his components giving him Thunderon's incredible strength, Demonite's skill, and Falkar's speed. His main attacks include firing energy blasts from his sword arm and moving at high speed while spinning like a top.

The Rangers had a hard time fighting Troika. Luckily, Ms. Fairweather is able to provide the Rangers with the Battle Boosters in their next battle, allowing them to destroy Troika.

Troika speaks with the voices of Demonite, Thunderon and Falkar in unison.

Triskull
Triskull is a demon warrior who swears allegiance to Trakeena. He is the leader of the Ghouls, foot soldiers Trakeena uses with the destruction of her Sting Wingers. He pretends to aid Olympius in collecting energy for Queen Bansheera, but is actually collecting it so Trakeena can return to her insectoid form. He attempts to stop the Rangers from entering the building where the energy is kept and is destroyed by the Red Galaxy and Lightspeed Rangers.

Triskull's power is highly inconsistent since in the episode before his death, he easily defeated all Galaxy and Lightspeed Rangers.

Unlike most villains and monsters, Triskull did not explode after being killed by the Rangers. This is due to his Super Sentai counterpart not doing so.

Triskull is voiced by Michael Sorich.

Batlings
The Batlings are bat-like foot soldiers who are summoned from Jinxer's cards to act as the bulk of their forces. They resemble MMPR's Putty Patrollers, but have black outfits, large goggles on their eyes and small bat wings on their helmets and backs. They use small swords in combat and occasionally display the ability to transform into bats for ambushes.

Demonic monsters
The following monsters are conjured by Diabolico and his forces through Demon Cards. To make a demon grow, Jinxer would throw a magic card into their body (or their shattered remains) and cast an incantation, transforming the demon's body into a cloud of bats that coalesce into a larger form. If an Advanced Growth card is used, the demon can manifest in an even stronger form. Queen Bansheera displayed the ability to empower monsters in a similar fashion by planting her tentacles in their bodies. She can also seal their minds away to transform them into obedient servants. When a demon is destroyed, its spirit is sent to the Shadow World where the demons become a largely mindless husk of its former self only concerned with destroying everything it sees (a trait made more threatening by the fact that it cannot be killed with it being already dead).

 Ghouligan (voiced by Ken Merckx) – A fire-based demon. After Carter got a glimpse of him during his firefighting job, Ghouligan and the Batlings attacked Mariner Bay. This monster was destroyed by the Rangers' Rescue Blasters.
 Magmavore (voiced by Kim Strauss in the first appearance, David Lodge in the second appearance) – A giant lava golem that appeared from a meteor that crashed into Mariner Bay summoned by Jinxer. This monster was destroyed by the Lightspeed Megazord. Magmavore was later reawakened in a stronger form by Queen Bansheera where this form now wields a massive club. This monster was destroyed again by the Supertrain Megazord.
 Quakemon – A giant earthquake-based antlion demon with a dual face that is summoned by Loki and Jinxer. This monster was destroyed by the Lightspeed Megazord.
 Whirlin (voiced by John C. Hyke) – A tornado-based bat-like demon selected by Diabolico. This monster was destroyed by the Lightspeed Megazord.
 Fireor (voiced by Bob Papenbrook) – A sword-wielding fire-based gargoyle demon conjured by Impus who can perform fire and heat attacks. This monster was destroyed by the Lightspeed Megazord.
 Gold-Beak (voiced by Neil Kaplan) – A vampire bat demon.
 Elestomp (voiced by Stephen Apostolina) – An elephant demon selected by Loki. This monster was destroyed by the Unilaser.
 Strikning (voiced by Eddie Frierson) – A lightning-based demon that battled both the Cyborg Rangers (which were created by General McKnight's scientists) and the originals. Strikning could fire the spikes from his body to act as lightning rods. This monster was destroyed by the Lightspeed Megazord.
 Smogger (voiced by Richard Steven Horvitz) – A gas-based demon selected by Vypra. Smogger hurls explosive orbs at buildings that causes them to be set on fire. This monster was destroyed by the Red Ranger's Lightspeed Cycle and Rescue Speeder.
 Trifire (voiced by Dave Mallow) – A fire-breathing three-headed dragon demon created by Impus to cause Mt. Jasmine to erupt. This monster was destroyed by the Lightspeed Megazord. Trifire was later resurrected by Queen Bansheera in a stronger dragon-like form where he wields a double-bladed sword, gains stronger armor, and can shoot lightning out of his three heads. This monster was destroyed again by the Supertrain Megazord.
 Liztwin (voiced by Archie Kao) – A skeletal dinosaur/dragon-like demon with a dragon head for a right hand that was unleashed by Vypra to distract the Rangers while Ryan escaped. His advanced form has larger horns, two extra small horns, a back sail in place of his back spikes, and a large right hand with long knife-like claws on it in place of the dragon head. This monster was destroyed by the Supertrain Megazord.
 Demonite Clone (voiced by David Stenstrom) – After the Troika Monsters were defeated in battle against the Titanium Ranger, Diabolico gave the apologetic Demonite a special Mirror Card to aid him and his fellow monsters in the battle against the Rangers. When Demonite used the Mirror Card, it created a clone of himself. This clone almost exactly resembles the original Demonite except he possessed two sword gauntlets instead of one and had a blue visor.
 Cobra Monster (voiced by Richard Cansino) – A cobra demon with cobra-headed hands and two piles of snakes for legs that was associated with the Cobra Tattoo that Diabolico placed on Ryan's back. Once the Cobra Monster was destroyed by Ryan, the Cobra Tattoo on him disappeared.
 Thunderclaw (voiced by Bob Papenbrook) - A stag beetle demon that aided Vypra in a failed attempt to infiltrate the Lightspeed Aquabase. He can emit electricity from his horns. This monster was destroyed by the Lightspeed Solarzord.
 Shockatron (voiced by Herbie Baez) - An electronic demon sent to destroy electronic plants. This monster was destroyed by the Lightspeed Megazord.
 Spellbinder (voiced by Kirk Thornton) - A mystical wizard demon. With the planets aligned, Spellbinder performs the ritual to bring back Queen Bansheera. This monster was destroyed by the Lightspeed Solarzord.
 Moleman (voiced by Ken Merckx) - A dog/mole demon who invented a laser powered by Vypra's stolen Starlight Crystals. This monster was destroyed by the V-Lancers.
 Cyclopter (voiced by Richard Epcar) - A cyclops demon created by Loki when he was challenged by Olympius to create a worthy monster. This monster was destroyed by the Omega Megazord.
 Mantevil (voiced by Michael McConnohie) - A powerful praying mantis demon who accompanied Olympius in an attack upon downtown Mariner Bay. This monster was destroyed by the Omega Megazord, the Lightspeed Solarzord, and the Supertrain Megazord.
 Vilevine (voiced by Kim Strauss) - A rafflesia/ivy demon unleashed by Olympius. This monster was destroyed by the Omega Megazord.
 Freezard (voiced by Steve McGowan) - An ice-spewing cobra-like demon unleashed by Olympius. Any monster sucked into Freezard gets trapped in his frigid stomach where they will slowly become frozen. This monster was destroyed by the Omega Megazord.
 Infinitor (voiced by Paul Schrier) - A powerful dragon/lizard-like warrior who strongly resembles his creator Olympius. This monster was destroyed by the Omega Megazord using the Lightspeed Sword.
 Monster Egg - This egg was said to hatch into a very powerful stingray-like monster that would destroy whatever it saw.
 Birdbane (voiced by Michael Sorich) - A goofy jungle crow demon that was summoned by Jinxer to help reclaim the Monster Egg. Birdbane was the self-proclaimed "King of Winged Demon Creatures". His advanced form sports a knight-like helmet and shoulder pads. This monster was destroyed by the Supertrain Megazord.
 Memorase (voiced by Marc Caldera) - A memory-erasing killer whale demon sent by Diabolico. This monster was destroyed by the Lightspeed Solarzord. He is voiced by Marc Caldera.
 Gatekeeper (voiced by Michael Sorich) - The Gatekeeper of the Shadow World is an entity guarding the gateway between Skull Castle and the Shadow World. Olympius summoned the Gatekeeper for help to rid himself of the Rangers for good. The Gatekeeper was able to summon the spirits of past monsters with his staff and control them. His ultimate fate is unknown as he escapes the Shadow World with Olympius and grows large, but is not destroyed on-screen. This monster was presumably destroyed off-screen by the Omega Megazord and Lightspeed Solarzord.
 Furnaceface - A defeated barnacle demon in the Shadow World summoned by the Gatekeeper who was able to chase the Rangers.
 Zombeast - A defeated unnamed mummy demon in the Shadow World summoned by the Gatekeeper.
 Flowar  A defeated unnamed flower demon in the Shadow World summoned by the Gatekeeper.
 Firemoth  A defeated unnamed mosquito/moth/wasp demon. His advanced form appeared in the Shadow World summoned by the Gatekeeper.
 Mermatron  A female bat-winged siren/mermaid demon. Her advanced form has her sporting new armor, a mask, and a fish tail-shaped sickle for a right hand. This demon was named in the video game. Her advanced form appeared as a defeated demon in the Shadow World that was summoned by Gatekeeper.
 Aquafiend (voiced by Peter Greenwood) - A kappa demon summoned by Diabolico. According to Diabolico, Aquafiend was the only demon monster that was not affected by water like the other demons were. In fact, Aquafiend lived in the waters of a lagoon near Mariner Bay. Diabolico summoned Aquafiend to retrieve Neptune's trident and use it to drain all the water from Mariner Bay so the demons could attack the Aquabase undeterred. This monster was destroyed by the Omega Megazord.
 Arachnor (voiced by Catherine Battistone) - A spider demon. This monster was destroyed by the Red Ranger's Trans-Armor Mode.
 Treevil (voiced by John C. Hyke) - A tree demon created by Jinxer when he used a monster card on a nearby tree. Treevil can throw explosive acorns around like grenades and has super-strength enough to uproot a tree and use it as a club. This monster was destroyed by the Lightspeed Megazord.
 Abominus - A slimy demon supposedly possessing ice-based powers.

Notes

References

External links
 Official Power Rangers Website
 

Television characters introduced in 2000
Lightspeed Rescue
Characters
Lists of fictional military personnel